Ahmed Joumari (1939 Casablanca – 1995) was a Moroccan writer and poet. He was one of the pioneers of modern Arabic poetry in 
Morocco.

References

External links
Poetry International Web  (retrieved Feb. 14, 2009)

Bibliography
Ahmed al-Joumari, Ashar fi al hubb wa al mawt, 1978

20th-century Moroccan poets
1939 births
1995 deaths
People from Casablanca
20th-century poets